Aglaia angustifolia is a species of plant in the family Meliaceae. It is found in Brunei, Indonesia, Malaysia, and the Philippines.

References

angustifolia
Vulnerable plants
Taxonomy articles created by Polbot